Codex Campianus is designated as "M" or "021" in the Gregory-Aland cataloging system and as "ε 72" in the Von Soden system. It is a Greek uncial manuscript of the New Testament, dated palaeographically to the 9th century. The manuscript has complex contents. It has marginalia and was prepared for liturgical (religious) use.

The text of the manuscript was held in high esteem by some 19th-century scholars, but this general opinion changed in the 20th century; as a result the manuscript is rarely cited in critical editions of the Greek New Testament.

Description 
The leaves are arranged in quarto and the text is written in two columns per page, 24 lines per column, in very elegant and small uncial letters, with breathings and accents (in red). The letters are similar to those from Codex Mosquensis II.

The liturgical notes at the margin are written in minuscule letters. According to the biblical scholar Tischendorf the handwriting of the liturgical notes at the margin is very similar to the Oxforder manuscript of Plato dated to the year 895 and housed at the Bodleian Library.

Codex Campianus has a number of errors due to contemporary changes in the pronunciation of Greek, a phenomenon known as iotacism. It has errors of N ephelkystikon.

The text of the Gospels is divided according to the Ammonian Sections. It has Harmony of the Gospels written at the bottom.

It is a small manuscript. Besides the New Testament text, it contains Chronology of the Gospels, Epistula ad Carpianum, Eusebian Canon tables, liturgical books with hagiographies (Synaxarion and Menologion),  (notes of the Church Lessons), musical notes in red, some Arabic text on the last leaf, and a note in Slavonic.
The Arabic note is illegible except one word "Jerusalem". Some notes are written in very small letters.

Text 
The Greek text of this codex is representative of the Byzantine text-type, with a number of Caesarean readings. According to Tischendorf its text is close to Codex Cyprius. According to Hermann Von Soden it is a result of Pamphil's recension.

Kurt and Barbara Aland gave the following textual profile of it 21, 21/2, 82, 3s. This means the text of the codex agrees with the Byzantine standard text 202 times, it agrees 7 times with the original text against the Byzantine and it agrees both with the Byzantine and original text 106 times. There are 12 independent or distinctive readings in this codex. On the basis of this profile, Alands considered the quality of the text to suit his Category III. Commonly, it is included in Family 1424 group of New Testament manuscripts.

In Matthew 1:11 it has the additional text also found in manuscripts Codex Koridethi, Σ, f1, 33, 258, Minuscules: 478, 661, 791, 954, 1216, 1230, 1354, 1604, ℓ 54, syrh and other manuscripts. This variation was observed by Bernard de Montfaucon.

It contains the text of the Pericope Adulterae (John 7:53-8:11), just as Γ, f1, 892, 1049, 1220, and 2661 also do. In John 8:11 it has the reading:
τουτο δε ειπαν πειραζοντες αυτον ινα εχωσιν κατηγοριαν κατ αυτου
which translates to "But this they said tempting him, that they might have to accuse him;" a dislocation of verse 6. John 8:11 is usually quoted as "She said, No man, Lord. And Jesus said unto her, Neither do I condemn thee: go, and sin no more".

History 

Bernard de Montfaucon dated the manuscript to the 10th or 11th century, because of palaeographical similarities to the manuscripts housed in Italian libraries. Tischendorf dated it to the last half of the 9th century, because of similarities between liturgical notes of the codex and the Oxforder manuscript of Plato dated to the year 895. Tregelles dated it to the end of the 9th century or beginning of the 10th century. Currently it is dated by the Institute for New Testament Textual Research (INTF) to the 9th century.

The manuscript was brought from the East to Paris. It was called Campianus after François de Camps, who gave it to Louis XIV in 1707. It was used by the scholar Kuster in 1710 and reprinted by him for Mill's Novum Testamentum Graecum. The text was collated by S. P. Tregelles. It was examined and described by Bernard de Montfaucon, who gave its first description and first facsimile, and by Giuseppe Bianchini, who collated its text.

It was added to the list of the New Testament manuscripts by the Swiss theologian, Wettstein, who gave siglum "M" to it.
In 1908 C. R. Gregory gave it the siglum "021".

Some non-biblical material of the codex, such as Synaxarion and Menologion, was published by Scholz in the same place as those of the Codex Cyprius, but with carelessness according to Tischendorf. Dean Burgon has observed that its "Harmony of the Gospels" is of the same type as in Codex Basilensis.

According to 19th century scholars like Tregelles, "it contains many good readings" and Scrivener said the manuscript has a good text. In the 20th century the manuscript remains largely neglected by scholars and its text is classified as "low valuable" (using the V Aland's Catalog).

Russell Champlin examined its text in the Gospel of Matthew and its relationship to the textual family E.

Currently the codex is located in the Bibliothèque nationale de France in Paris.

The manuscript was cited in at least one critical edition of the Greek New Testament, UBS3. It is not cited in UBS4, NA26, or NA27, versions of the Greek New Testament however.

See also 

 List of New Testament uncials
 Textual criticism
 Biblical manuscript

References

Further reading

External links 

 Robert Waltz, Codex Campianus Me (021): at the Encyclopedia of Textual Criticism
 

Greek New Testament uncials
9th-century biblical manuscripts
Bibliothèque nationale de France collections